Master Sergeant Juan E. Negrón (September 26, 1929 – March 29, 1996) was a member of the United States Army who served in the 65th Infantry Regiment during the Korean War. He was awarded a Distinguished Service Cross for his actions during combat in the Chinese Spring Offensive at Kalma-Eri, North Korea, on April 28, 1951, which was posthumously upgraded to the Medal of Honor in 2014.

Early life and military career
Juan E. Negrón Martínez  was born and raised in the town of Corozal, Puerto Rico. In March 1948, he entered the U.S. Army in San Juan and was assigned to the 65th Infantry Regiment.

Upon the outbreak of the Korean War, the men of the 65th, now attached to the Army's 3rd Infantry Division, deployed to the Republic of Korea. They were among the first infantrymen to meet the enemy on the battlefield. After November 1950, they fought daily against units of the Chinese People's Volunteer Army (PVA) after the Chinese entered the war on the North Korean side. One of the hardships suffered by the Puerto Ricans was the lack of warm clothing during the cold and harsh winters. Among the battles and operations in which the 65th participated was Operation Killer in January 1951, becoming the first regiment to cross the Han River in South Korea during the operation. In April 1951, the regiment participated in the Uijeonbu Corridor drives.

On April 28, 1951, Negrón's unit came under heavy enemy attack. He was able to halt the enemy attack, despite the wounds which he received, by accurately throwing hand grenades at short range. For his actions, he was awarded the Distinguished Service Cross, the Army's second highest military decoration for heroism.

After the war, Negrón continued to serve in the military. Among the positions which he held were that of senior non-commissioned officer for the Directorate of Doctrine and inspector general in Thailand. Master Sergeant Negrón retired from the U.S. Army in 1971 after 23 years of service.

Later years
Upon his retirement, he entered the federal service in Bayamón, Puerto Rico.

On March 29, 1996, Negrón died in Bayamón, Puerto Rico. He was buried with military honors in plot J 0 3180 of the Puerto Rico National Cemetery located in the city of  Bayamon.

Honors
The Puerto Rico National Guard Readiness Center at Fort Buchanan, Puerto Rico will posthumously be named after Korean War Veteran and former member of the 65th Infantry Regiment and Medal of Honor recipient Master Sergeant Juan E. Negrón. A statue in honor of Master Sgt. Juan E. Negron is located in his hometown of Corozal, Puerto Rico.

Medal of Honor

Negron's distinguished Service Cross was upgraded to the Medal of Honor by President Barack Obama in a ceremony in the White House.

The award came through the National Defense Authorization Act which called for a review of Jewish American and Hispanic American veterans from World War II, the Korean War and the Vietnam War to ensure that no prejudice was shown to those deserving the Medal of Honor.

Negrón is among three other Puerto Ricans whose Distinguished Service Cross was upgraded to the Medal of Honor, the highest military decoration in the United States. He also has the distinction of being one of nine Puerto Ricans and the only member of the 65th Infantry Regiment to be honored with the decoration. The award citation content, with the exception of the heading, remains the same as that for the Distinguished Service Cross.

Medal of Honor citation

Military decorations
Negrón's military decorations include:

Foreign decoration
The Bravery Gold Medal of Greece was given by the Government of Greece to the 65th Infantry Regiment and to the members of the regiment who fought in the Korean War.
  Chryssoun Aristion Andrias (Bravery Gold Medal of Greece)

Congressional Gold Medal

On June 10, 2014, President Barack Obama, signed the legislation, titled "The Borinqueneers CGM Bill", at an official ceremony. The Bill honors the 65th Infantry Regiment with the Congressional Gold Medal.

See also

List of Puerto Ricans
List of Puerto Rican military personnel
List of Korean War Medal of Honor recipients
Puerto Rican recipients of the Medal of Honor
List of Hispanic Medal of Honor recipients
Borinqueneers Congressional Gold Medal

Notes

References

Further reading
" My Dad; My Hero: This Is Your Life" (Juan E Negron's Biography) by Iris N. Negron (Juan E. Negron's Daughter) & Co-writer Gilberto Rivera Santiago " 
Puertorriquenos Who Served With Guts, Glory, and Honor. Fighting to Defend a Nation Not Completely Their Own; by : Greg Boudonck; 
" Cuando El Rio de Corozal Cruzaba El Paralelo 38 " 
" Puerto Rican Bloodshed On The 38th Parallel " 

1929 births
1996 deaths
United States Army non-commissioned officers
United States Army personnel of the Korean War
Korean War recipients of the Medal of Honor
Puerto Rican recipients of the Medal of Honor
United States Army Medal of Honor recipients
United States Army soldiers
People from Corozal, Puerto Rico
Puerto Rican Army personnel